Beta-mannosylphosphodecaprenol---mannooligosaccharide 6-mannosyltransferase (mannosylphospholipid-methylmannoside alpha-1,6-mannosyltransferase, beta-D-mannosylphosphodecaprenol:1,6-alpha-D-mannosyloligosaccharide 1,6-alpha-D-mannosyltransferase) is an enzyme with systematic name beta-D-mannosylphosphodecaprenol:(1->6)-alpha-D-mannosyloligosaccharide 6-alpha-D-mannosyltransferase. This enzyme catalyses the following chemical reaction

 beta-D-mannosylphosphodecaprenol + (1->6)-alpha-D-mannosyloligosaccharide  decaprenol phosphate + (1->6)-alpha-D-mannosyl-(1->6)-alpha-D-mannosyl-oligosaccharide

This enzyme is involved in the formation of mannooligosaccharides in the membrane of Mycobacterium smegmatis.

References

External links 
 

EC 2.4.1